Wyoming Highway 339 (WYO 339) is a short  east-west Wyoming State Road located in north-central Sheridan County.

Route description
Wyoming Highway 339 begins its western end at Interstate 90/US 14/US 87 (exit 16) and travels east just over 1 mile to end at Wyoming Highway 338 (Decker Road). WYO 338 travels south to serve Sheridan as well as north to the Montana State Line and Decker, Montana. 

The Wyoming Port of Entry is located on the west side of the I-90/WYO 339 (Dietz) interchange and is the only two-state combination Port in Wyoming that issues both Wyoming and Montana permits.

History
The length of Highway 339 between Wyoming Highway 338 and Interstate 90 is the original routing of US 14/US 87 route prior to the construction of Interstate 90.

Major intersections

References

External links 

Wyoming State Routes 300-399
Wyoming Highway 339 - WYO 338 to I-90/US-14/US-87
Sheridan/Dietz Port of Entry
Transportation in Sheridan County, Wyoming
339